The Yilo Krobo constituency is in the Eastern region of Ghana. The current member of Parliament for the constituency is Albert Tetteh Nyakotey. He was elected on the ticket of the National Democratic Congress (NDC) and  won a majority of 4,687 votes more than candidate closest in the race, to win the constituency election to become the MP. He had represented the constituency in the 4th Republican parliament.

On 21 January 2012, Raymond Tawiah lost the chance to represent the constituency for the third time. He was replaced by  Kofi Amoatey who defeated the incumbent in the Primaries. On 7 December 2012 Kofi Amoatey standing on the ticket of the ruling National Democratic Congress, polled 26,581 votes representing 60.36% of valid votes cast to beat his closest rival Christian Kofi Tettey of the opposition New Patriotic Party who only managed 14,510 representing 32.95% despite having attempted to capture the seat in the last 5 parliamentary elections.

Members of Parliament

See also

 List of Ghana Parliament constituencies

References

Parliamentary constituencies in the Eastern Region (Ghana)